The name Malou has been used to name four tropical cyclones in the northwestern Pacific Ocean. The name is an agate and was submitted by Macao.

 Tropical Storm Malou (2004) (T0411, 15W) – struck Japan.
 Tropical Storm Malou (2010) (T1009, 10W, Henry) – struck Japan and brought heavy rain.
 Tropical Storm Malou (2016) (T1613) - a storm that was not recognized by the JTWC.
 Typhoon Malou (2021) (T2120, 25W) - a strong typhoon that remained out to sea.

Pacific typhoon set index articles